Only with You may refer to:

 "Only with You" (Blue System song), 1996
 "Only with You" (Captain Hollywood Project song), 1993
 "Only with You", a song by The Beach Boys from Holland

English phrases